Hong Kong Institute of Architects (HKIA) is a professional body for architects in Hong Kong with approximately 1500 full members, 300 associates members and graduate members. It is an Allied Society of the Royal Institute of British Architects, and member of the International Union of Architects and the Commonwealth Association of Architects.

History
Originally named the Hong Kong Society of Architects, it was formed on 3 September 1956 by 27 architects. It is recognized by the Royal Institute of British Architects as an Allied Society since 1957 and renamed to Hong Kong Institute of Architects in 1972.

Designation
The professional post-nominals system of HKIA was introduced in 1972, members are entitled to use the post-nominals HKIA after their name, and describe themselves as "architect" or "Member of The Hong Kong Institute of Architects", while associates may describe themselves as "Associate of The Hong Kong Institute of Architects", no post-nominal or abbreviation is permitted.

Scandal 
In 2020, HKIA has "skipped" its 64th anniversary on its social media for alleged political sensitivity (assimilation with the June 4th massacre) and went straight to celebrate its 65th anniversary which was due to take place in 2021.

Past Presidents

See also

Architecture of Hong Kong
Hong Kong Institute of Planners
Hong Kong Institute of Urban Design

References

External links

Hong Kong Institute of Architects

Professional associations based in Hong Kong
Architecture in Hong Kong
Architecture groups
1956 establishments in Hong Kong
Arts organizations established in 1956
Architecture-related professional associations
Commonwealth Association of Architects